HMS Shrewsbury was a 74-gun third-rate ship of the line of the Royal Navy, launched on 23 February 1758 at Deptford Dockyard.

Service history

1758
In March 1758 the newly commissioned Shrewsbury, captained by Hugh Palliser joined forces with the smaller warships HMS Unicorn and HMS Lizard off Brest where the French frigate Calypso was destroyed in Audierne Bay on 12 September.

1759
From February 1759 Shrewsbury was in the  North American theatre, and was at the campaign against the French in Quebec which came to a conclusion on 13 September that year.

1760 and 1761
From the summer of 1760 Shrewsbury served in the Mediterranean Sea, forcing the French squadron from Toulon to seek protection in the Crete harbour of Candia.

1762

Fate
In 1783, she was condemned and scuttled.

Notes

Citations

References
 Michael Phillips. Shrewsbury (74) (1758). Michael Phillips' Ships of the Old Navy. Retrieved 31 August 2008.
 

Ships of the line of the Royal Navy
Dublin-class ships of the line
1758 ships